The Donau City Church, known more formally by its dedication as Christus, Hoffnung der Welt ("Christ, Hope of the World") is a Roman Catholic parish church  in Vienna's 22nd district (Donau City or Donaustadt). The church is located next to the Vienna International Centre. Its architect is Heinz Tesar.

Notes

External links

Roman Catholic church buildings in the Vicariate of Vienna City
Buildings and structures in Donaustadt